William Augustine Whelan (1 April 1935 – 6 February 1958), also known as Billy Whelan or Liam Whelan, was an Irish footballer and one of the eight Manchester United players who were killed in the Munich air disaster. He was 22 years old when he died.

Whelan was born in Dublin. He was one of seven children born to John and Elizabeth Whelan; his father had died in 1943, when Whelan was just eight years old. He was not a confident flyer and just before the aeroplane took off from Munich, he was heard to say: "This may be death, but I'm ready."

He played Gaelic games, winning a medal for St Peter's of Phibsboro. Dublin GAA club Naomh Fionnbarra successfully had a railway bridge situated near the place of Whelan's birth renamed after him in 2006, while the Naomh Fionnbarra clubhouse also has Whelan's Manchester United membership card.

Club career

Whelan began his career with Home Farm before joining Manchester United as an 18-year-old in 1953. He was capped four times for the Republic of Ireland national team, but did not score. His brother John played for Shamrock Rovers and Drumcondra F.C.

He made his first appearance for United during the 1954–55 season and quickly became a regular first team player, and went on to make 98 first-team appearances in four seasons at United, scoring 52 goals. He was United's top scorer in the 1956–57 season, scoring 26 goals in the First Division and 33 in all competitions as United won their second successive league title and reached the semi-finals of the European Cup and FA Cup. Such was the strength of the competition in the United first team that he was soon being kept out of the side by Bobby Charlton. He travelled with the United team to Belgrade for the fateful European Cup tie against Red Star Belgrade, the day before the Munich air disaster, but did not play in the game.

Legacy

On 8 December 2006, the railway bridge on Fassaugh Road/Dowth Avenue junction in Cabra, Dublin 7, close to Dalymount Park was renamed in his honour. The campaign to have the bridge renamed was initiated and organised by members of the Cabra GAA club, Naomh Fionbarra (Irish language spelling) (St Finbarr's) and sanctioned by Dublin City Council in early 2006. It is close to St Attracta Road, the street in which he was born. The unveiling ceremony was performed by Whelan's Manchester United teammate at the time of the aircrash, Sir Bobby Charlton.

On 4 February 2008, the Irish national postal body An Post issued a 55c postage stamp for the 50th anniversary of the Munich air disaster showing a photo of Liam Whelan.

Whelan is buried in Glasnevin Cemetery.

Honours
Manchester United
Football League First Division (2): 1955–56, 1956–57
FA Charity Shield (2): 1956, 1957

See also
 List of people on the postage stamps of Ireland

References

1935 births
1958 deaths
Association footballers from Dublin (city)
Association football inside forwards
English Football League players
Gaelic footballers who switched code
Home Farm F.C. players
Manchester United F.C. players
Republic of Ireland association footballers
Republic of Ireland international footballers
People educated at Synge Street CBS
People from Cabra, Dublin
Footballers killed in the Munich air disaster
FA Cup Final players